is a railway station in the city of Okazaki, Aichi Prefecture, Japan, operated by the third sector Aichi Loop Railway Company.

Lines

Station layout
The station has a single elevated island platform serving two tracks, with the station building located underneath. The station building has automated ticket machines, TOICA automated turnstiles and is staffed.

Platforms

Adjacent stations

Station history
Kita-Okazaki Station was opened on October 1, 1970 as a freight station on the Japan National Railways (JNR), primary to support the operations of nearby factories of Toyota Motors and its affiliated companies. Scheduled passenger operations began from April 26, 1976. With the privatization of the JNR on April 1, 1987, the station came under control of JR Central. The station was transferred to the third sector Aichi Loop Railway Company on January 31, 1988. Freight operations were discontinued from 2010.

Passenger statistics
In fiscal 2017, the station was used by an average of 1795 passengers daily.

Surrounding area
 Okazaki City Nursing College
 Okazaki Nishi High School

See also
 List of railway stations in Japan

References

External links

Official home page 

Railway stations in Japan opened in 1970
Railway stations in Aichi Prefecture
Okazaki, Aichi